Wayne Lewis Dickert (born December 8, 1958) is an American slalom canoer who competed in the mid-1990s. He finished 11th in the C-2 event at the 1996 Summer Olympics in Atlanta.

Works
Wayne Dickert, Jon Rounds, Skip Brown (photo), Roberto Sabas (illus.), Basic Kayaking: All the Skills and Gear You Need to Get Started, 2005. Winner of the 2005 National Outdoor Book Award (Instructional).
Jon Rounds, Wayne Dickert, Skip Brown (photo), Taina Litwak (illus.), Basic Canoeing: All the Skills and Tools You Need to Get Started. Winner of the 2003 National Outdoor Book Award (Instructional).

References

1958 births
American male canoeists
Canoeists at the 1996 Summer Olympics
Living people
Olympic canoeists of the United States